Changyuan is a county-level city in the east of Henan province, China, bordering Shandong province to the east. Formerly under the administration of the prefecture-level city of Xinxiang, since 1 January 2014 it has been directly administered by the province.

Administration
Subdistricts:
Puxi Subdistrict, Pudong Subdistrict, Nanpu Subdistrict, Pubei Subdistrict

Towns:
Dingluan, Xiangxiang, Weizhuang, Naoli, Changcun, Zhaodi, Menggang, Mancun

Townships:
Lugang Township, Miaozhai Township, Fangli Township, Wuqiu Township, Shejia Township, Zhangsanzhai Township

Climate

Economy
Changyuan is an important industrial base. Most notably the city has a production capacity of 260,000 cranes a year, composing 68% of the Chinese crane market. Other industries clustered around the city are medical equipment and hygiene supplies and anti-corrosion materials. The city has been named the 'Chinese capital of medical consumables'. Presumably, local farmers started making cotton swabs and balls in the 1970s, laying the groundwork for this industry.

References

External links

County-level divisions of Henan
Xinxiang